Asplund  is a Swedish surname. Notable people with the surname include:

Arne Asplund (1903–1993), Swedish scientist and inventor
Bo  Asplund (fl. 1998), Swedish diplomat
Carl-Erik Asplund (born 1923), Swedish speed skater
Gunnar Asplund (1885–1940), Swedish architect
Jennie Asplund (born 1979) and Johanna Asplund (born 1981), Swedish members of the rock band Sahara Hotnights
Johan Asplund (1937–2018), Swedish sociologist
Johan Asplund (ice hockey) (born 1980), Swedish ice hockey player
Josefin Asplund (born 1991), Swedish actress
Karl Asplund (1890–1978), Swedish poet, short story writer, and art historian
Lena Asplund (born 1956), Swedish politician
Lillian Asplund (1906–2006), last American survivor of the sinking of the Titanic
Rasmus Asplund (born 1997), Swedish ice hockey player

See also
Asplundh Tree Expert Company, American based tree trimming/utility company
Asplund Library, Rotunda library building in Stockholm, Sweden designed by Swedish architect Gunnar Asplund

Swedish-language surnames